Family Wrestling Entertainment, also known as FWE, was an independent professional wrestling promotion. The company was based and ran shows in New York. They hosted a show about every four months. All of their shows are available on iPPV and also on DVD and Blu-ray through their site.

History
Family Wrestling Entertainment (FWE) was founded by Jordan Schneider in 2011, with the concept of all family wrestling. On October 5, 2012, FWE held their first iPPV. In October 2013, FWE held the Openweight Prix Tournament, which was won by Tony Nese. However, the promotion entered into hiatus until 2014.

On February 7, 2015, FWE held the No Limits iPPV. It was on this card that the Insane Championship Wrestling Heavyweight Championship was renamed the ICW World Heavyweight Championship due to Drew Galloway successfully retaining against Matt Hardy, which was the first defence of this Scottish title in the USA.

On March 31, 2015, FWE announced the cancellation of their April events. The promotion has not held an event since March 11, 2015.

Championships

Last champions

FWE Heavyweight Championship

The FWE Heavyweight Championship was a championship in FWE. The first holder of the title was Charlie Haas. There have been seven reigns, shared between seven different wrestlers.

FWE Tri-Borough Championship

The FWE Tri-Borough Championship was a championship in FWE. The first holder of the title was Damien Darling. There have been four reigns, shared between three different wrestlers.

FWE Women's Championship

The FWE Women's Championship was a women's professional wrestling championship in FWE. The first holder of the title was Maria Kanellis, who won a four-woman tournament on February 25, 2012. The last holder of the title was Veda Scott, who won on March 11, 2015.

FWE Tag Team Championship

The FWE Tag Team Championship was a championship in FWE. The first holders of the title were Adrenaline Express (EJ Risk and VSK).

References

External links
 

Entertainment companies established in 2011
American independent professional wrestling promotions based in New York (state)